Eduard Löwen (born 28 January 1997) is a German professional footballer who plays as a midfielder for Major League Soccer club St. Louis City SC.

Club career
On 24 June 2022, Löwen signed a contract with MLS club St. Louis City SC, who would begin play in the 2023 season, through the 2026 season with an option for 2027. He would join the second team in 2022. 

In week two of the 2023 season, Löwen was named to the league's Team of the Matchday after scoring the game-winning goal in a 3–1 victory over Charlotte FC.

Personal life
Born in Germany, he is of Russia German descent.

Career statistics

References

External links

1997 births
Living people
People from Birkenfeld (district)
German people of Russian descent
Footballers from Rhineland-Palatinate
German footballers
Association football midfielders
Germany youth international footballers
Germany under-21 international footballers
Olympic footballers of Germany
Footballers at the 2020 Summer Olympics
1. FC Nürnberg II players
1. FC Nürnberg players
Hertha BSC players
Hertha BSC II players
FC Augsburg players
VfL Bochum players
Bundesliga players
2. Bundesliga players
Regionalliga players
German expatriate footballers
Expatriate soccer players in the United States
German expatriate sportspeople in the United States
Designated Players (MLS)
MLS Next Pro players